Surepally is a village in Nalgonda district of Telangana, India. It falls under Bhongir mandal.

References

Villages in Nalgonda district